Jester Center or Jester Center Residence Halls is a co-educational residence hall at The University of Texas at Austin, built in 1969. The residence hall was named after Beauford H. Jester, who served as the Governor of Texas from 1947 until 1949.

Facilities 

With a capacity of 3,200 (3,300 with supplemental housing) students, it was the largest residence hall in North America at the time it was built. The building complex, which occupies a full city block, was the largest building in Austin, Texas when built and was the largest building project in University history.

The complex includes two towers: a 14-level residence (Jester West) and a 10-level residence (Jester East). The first four floors in Jester West still have built-in furniture, while the remaining floors and all of Jester East have been completely renovated to offer movable furniture.  All rooms boast XL-twin beds. While some rooms have private or connecting baths, most students use community restroom facilities. Each tower also has study rooms, lounges, laundry rooms, and storage areas. From time to time, the study lounges have been converted into "supplemental housing" for students who are not allotted a standard residence hall room.

The residence hall also houses several offices for student services, tutoring, mentoring, academic advising, classrooms, and lecture halls. The center also contains an all-you-can-eat cafeteria called "J2 Dining" (signifying Jester 2nd floor), a Wendy's, an a la carte dining center known as "Jester City Limits" (an allusion to Austin City Limits), a convenience store named "Jester City Market", Jesta' Pizza, Jester Java, which serves Starbucks, a bubble tea shop named "Bliss," and the Jesta' Texas Gift Shop, selling UT apparel.

Features
Baby grand pianos are located on the second floor of Jester West and on the first floor of Jester East, off the lobby, for the enjoyment of the residents.

The Fireplace Lounge in Jester West and the First Floor Lobby in Jester East feature large-screen televisions and comfortable chairs.

Residents often use the numerous lounge areas as meeting places or group study areas.  At least one lounge is located on each floor, but there is also a 24-hour quiet study lounge across from the Jester West Desk.

Jester is located right across the street from the Perry–Castañeda Library, Gregory Gymnasium, Lee and Joe Jamail Texas Swimming Center, and many academic buildings.

Jester has a variety of room types.  It is roughly half double rooms with community bath and half double rooms with connecting bath.  There are two double rooms with a private bath on each floor.  Jester also has several triple rooms and single rooms throughout the hall.  Finally, Jester houses a significant number of students in supplemental housing spaces at the beginning of each semester.  These rooms are study lounges made to house four students and are generally so popular that it's hard to get students to move out of them when permanent spaces become available.

Jester Center also houses the Learning Center, the Center for African and African-American Studies, an Engineering, Communications and Natural Sciences advising office, the Career Exploration Center and many classrooms.  It is not uncommon for students to live and attend classes within Jester.

The Jester East front desk offers students the option to check out DVDs for forty-eight hours at a time.

Jester houses one large computer lab in Jester West, where residents may write papers, finish homework or complete projects.

Urban legends 
According to student folklore, the structure was designed by an architect who specialized in prison design, specifically women's prisons due to the shower heads being placed fairly low (folklore c. at least 1983).  A true fact is that Jester once had its own ZIP code, 78787; this was changed c. 1986.  Currently, the University as a whole makes up a large part of the 78705 ZIP code, and Jester residence hall serves as a polling place for Precinct 148 in Texas Congressional District 21.

Jester Center was occasionally featured—particularly in panning the dorm's dining facilities—in artist Berkeley Breathed's comic strip The Academia Waltz, which was published in The Daily Texan in 1978-79, when Breathed was a UT undergrad.  The strip was the predecessor to Breathed's famous Bloom County comic.

References

External links 

Map: 
Photo and UT Location map
Dining facilities available in Jester Center
UT Learning Center

University and college dormitories in the United States
University of Texas at Austin campus
University and college buildings completed in 1969
1969 establishments in Texas